Hagen Pohle (born 5 March 1992) is a German racewalker. He competed in the 20 kilometres walk event at the 2015 World Championships in Athletics in Beijing, China. At the 2016 Summer Olympics, he competed in the 20 km walk event where he finished in 18th place and the 50 km walk event where he did not finish. In 2019, he competed in the men's 20 kilometres walk at the 2019 World Athletics Championships held in Doha, Qatar. He finished in 17th place.

See also
 Germany at the 2015 World Championships in Athletics

References

External links 
 
 
 
 

German male racewalkers
Living people
Place of birth missing (living people)
1992 births
World Athletics Championships athletes for Germany
Athletes (track and field) at the 2016 Summer Olympics
Olympic athletes of Germany